Fance Hariyanto (born October 1, 1983 in Pekanbaru) is an Indonesian footballer who currently plays for PSPS Pekanbaru in the Indonesia Super League.

Club statistics

References

External links

1983 births
Association football goalkeepers
Living people
Indonesian footballers
Liga 1 (Indonesia) players
PSPS Pekanbaru players
Indonesian Premier Division players
Persijap Jepara players
People from Pekanbaru
Sportspeople from Riau